Tegarama (Old Assyria: Tergarma; Hittite: Takarama, Luwian: Lakarma/Lukarma) was a city in Anatolia during the Bronze Age. It is often identified with Gürün and biblical Togarmah.

A fortified city in Kammanu (on the border of Tabal) mentioned in Neo-Assyrian royal inscriptions of the ninth, eighth, and seventh centuries BC (reigns of Shalmaneser III, Sargon II, and Sennacherib) as Til-garimmu/Til-garimme.

Middle Bronze Age 
The city contained a palace, a karum and an Assyrian colony office. It was important in terms of trade which included tin, textiles, wool, slaves and wine. The city was inhabited during the Old Assyrian Kingdom and Hittite Empire.

Late Bronze Age

Reign of Tudhaliya III 
The city was sacked by Isuwa during the early reign of the Hittite king Tudhaliya III on the eastern border.

Reign of Suppiluliuma I 
During his victorious campaign against Mitanni, Hittite king Suppiluliuma I halted in Tegarama and inspected his forces before attacking and capturing Karkemish. Consequently, city must have been on the road from Hattusa to Karkhemish.

Theories 
The exact location of the city in Anatolia is disputed. Oliver Gurney placed Tegarama in Southeast Anatolia.   Others have located it in central Anatolia near the town of Gürün, Sivas about 90 miles (140 km) east of Kanesh.

Gürün 
Til-garimmu is usually identified with modern Gürün, biblical Tōgarmā, classical Gauraene/Gauraina, Old Assyrian Tergarama, Hittite Takarama, and Luwian Lakarma/Lukarma. However, no pre-Roman remains have been discovered at Gürün.

Akçadaǧ 
Akçadaǧ, ca. 30 km west of Malatya, has been tentatively suggested as an alternate location.

Changing location 
One theory is that the name of the city was 'moved' to another settlement during the history.

Biblical tradition 
The city is sometimes associated with Biblical Togarmah.

Bibliography
- YAMADA, SHIGEO. "The City of Togarma in Neo-Assyrian Sources" Altorientalische Forschungen, vol. 33, no. 2, 2006, pp. 223-236. https://doi.org/10.1524/aofo.2006.33.2.223

References

Hittite cities
Former populated places in Turkey
Lost ancient cities and towns